Leonardo Menichini (born 11 December 1953) is an Italian football manager and former player. He is currently in charge of Serie C club Monterosi.

Career

Playing
A defender, Menichini played for several top-flight teams, including AS Roma and Catanzaro, the latter under coach Carlo Mazzone.

Coaching
Following his retirement from playing football, Menichini became a coach, serving alongside Carlo Mazzone from 1993 to 2003 with top-flight teams such as Cagliari, AS Roma, Napoli, Bologna, Perugia and Brescia. In 2003, he accepted an offer from newly promoted Serie A team Ancona to become the biancorossi's boss; however, his first experience as head coach proved to be unsuccessful, since he was sacked after four weeks in charge of the team.

In February 2005, Menichini returned into football, replacing Salvo D'Adderio at the helm of Sassari Torres, who were in danger of relegation in the Serie C1, and then leading his side to maintain their own place in the third-highest Italian division.

Menichini then moved to Albania, as head coach of KF Tirana in 2005–06; he was however sacked in November 2005 due to disagreements with the board, leaving the club in second place. He then returned to work alongside Mazzone from February to June 2006, during the latter's unsuccessful spell as Livorno head coach.

In April 2008, Menichini was appointed as new head coach of Serie C2 promotion hopefuls Lumezzane, replacing Mario Petrone, who was sacked following a string of four consecutive defeats. Under his tenure, Lumezzane qualified to the promotion playoffs and ultimately won them, thus ensuring a place in the Lega Pro Prima Divisione 2008–09. He was subsequently confirmed at the helm of the club for the upcoming season.

In June 2010 he was appointed head coach of Calabrian side Crotone for the club's 2010–11 Serie B season. He was dismissed on 27 November 2010 after a 1–2 home loss to Vicenza, leaving Crotone in 11th place after 17 games. He was reinstated as Crotone head coach on 20 February 2011, following a string of negative results that led to the dismissal of Eugenio Corini. On 23 January 2012 he was finally sacked.

From 18 December 2012 to 10 February 2013 he then served as head coach of Grosseto in Serie B. In March 2014, he then served as new manager of Lega Pro Prima Divisione club Pisa until the end of the season.

On 18 August 2014 he was named new head coach of Lega Pro club Salernitana.

On 30 September 2017, he was fired as the head coach of Serie C club Reggiana.

On 9 May 2019, he was appointed manager of Salernitana, completing the season by winning the relegation playoffs against Venezia.

He successively became the Primavera Under-19 youth coach of Lazio, being in charge until 2021.

On 10 November 2021, he returned to management as the new head coach of Serie C club Monterosi, replacing David D'Antoni.

References

External links
Leonardo Menichini at Footballdatabase

1953 births
Living people
Sportspeople from the Province of Pisa
Association football midfielders
Italian footballers
Hellas Verona F.C. players
Novara F.C. players
A.S. Roma players
U.S. Catanzaro 1929 players
Ascoli Calcio 1898 F.C. players
U.S. Triestina Calcio 1918 players
Serie A players
Serie B players
Italian football managers
A.C. Ancona managers
KF Tirana managers
F.C. Lumezzane V.G.Z. A.S.D. managers
F.C. Crotone managers
F.C. Grosseto S.S.D. managers
Pisa S.C. managers
U.S. Salernitana 1919 managers
A.C. Reggiana 1919 managers
Serie A managers
Serie B managers
Serie C managers
Kategoria Superiore managers
Italian expatriate football managers
Expatriate football managers in Albania
Italian expatriate sportspeople in Albania
Footballers from Tuscany